The Royal Burnham Yacht Club (or RBYC) was founded in 1895. The club is located in Burnham-on-Crouch, England.  The RBYC is divided into two groups of members: the cadets nineteen and younger, and the full members who are over nineteen.  The club has a colourful history, including the launching of the 1983 Americas Cup Challenge: Victory Challenge. The Club has established relations with the Yacht Club De Monaco. With a team racing event that was held in Monaco for 8 cadets in April 2006.  The RBYC also has the largest fleet of RS Elite (3 man day-racing keelboats) in the country.

References

External links

See also
Crouch Yacht Club
Royal Corinthian Yacht Club

Royal yacht clubs
Coastal Essex
Sports clubs in Essex
Yacht clubs in England
1895 establishments in England
Burnham-on-Crouch